Ewald Türmer (born 22 April 1960) is a retired football midfielder from Austria.

During his club career, Türmer played for WAC St. Andrä, Austria Klagenfurt, FK Austria Wien, SK Sturm Graz and Wolfsberger AC. He also appeared eight times for the Austria national team.

External links
 
 

1960 births
Living people
Austrian footballers
Austria international footballers
Association football midfielders
FK Austria Wien players
SK Sturm Graz players
Wolfsberger AC players